Viktor Le (born 10 November 2003) is a Russian footballer of Vietnamese descent who plays as a midfielder for Binh Dinh FC.

Career

He played for the youth academy of Torpedo Moscow and CSKA Moscow.

In January 2023, he signed for Bình Định.

References

Russian footballers
2003 births
Living people
Binh Dinh FC players
Association football midfielders